Graham Skipper is an American actor, director and screenwriter. He is best known for his roles as Herbert West in Re-Animator: The Musical, Seth Hampton in Almost Human, Zack Connors in The Mind's Eye, Gordon Hardesty in Beyond the Gates and for writing and directing the horror film Sequence Break.

Life and career
Graham was born and raised in Fort Worth, Texas. He studied theatre at Fordham University, New York. He is a founding member of the comedy troupe FUCT. In 2011, he moved to Los Angeles for Stuart Gordon's stage adaptation of Re-Animator: The Musical.

In 2017, his horror film Sequence Break, premiered at Fantasia International Film Festival, Chattanooga Film Festival and London FrightFest Film Festival. It also won Best Feature at the Chattanooga Film Festival.

Filmography

As actor

References

External links

 

Living people
20th-century American male actors
American film producers
American male film actors
American male screenwriters
Horror film directors
1983 births